Ubaghara is an Upper Cross River language of Nigeria. 80% of speakers speak the principal dialect, Biakpan.

Dialects
Ubaghara dialects according to Blench (2019):

Biakpan
Ikun
Etono
Ugbem
Utuma

References

Languages of Nigeria
Upper Cross River languages